Cumberlandite is a type of igneous rock. It is the state rock of the U.S. state of Rhode Island. It is only found in large concentrations on a  lot in Blackstone Valley, Cumberland, and in traces scattered throughout the Narragansett Bay watershed. Due to its high amounts of iron, it is slightly magnetic.

Background
The rocks were discovered by settlers hundreds of years ago, and were initially deemed valuable for the manufacture of cannon and farm tools in the 18th and 19th centuries. The rock also contains a relatively high level of titanium, also valuable for the manufacture of tools. Colonists tried to make cannon from the rock during the Revolutionary War, but the cannon cracked because of the weakness of the iron.

Cumberlandite weathers to a brownish black with white crystals. This is strikingly different from the weathered look of other rocks in Rhode Island's glacial deposits. It is also much denser than the granites and metamorphic rocks that are common in these deposits. The rock is common in glacial deposits just south of its source location, and can be found in deposits all the way to the southern shore of Narragansett. This combination of coming from only one location, being obviously different from other rocks, and being easily identified by members of the public all may have led to its being selected as the Rhode Island state rock.

Petrology

The rock is an uncommon mafic igneous rock known as a troctolite. It is black with phenocrysts of plagioclase in a medium grained matrix of magnetite, ilmenite, olivine and hercynite spinel. The abundance of magnetite and ilmenite, which may be up to 70 percent of the rock, is responsible for the high density and magnetic property. Locally the parallel orientation of the lathlike plagioclase crystals gives the rock a flow lamination. The rock is part of the Esmond-Dedham Subterrane with an uncertain age from Late Proterozoic to Devonian.

References

Plutonic rocks
Geology of Rhode Island
Symbols of Rhode Island